Smitten is the second studio album by American alternative rock band The Martinis. It was released on May 4, 2004 by Cooking Vinyl, remaining as the band's final studio album release.

The record is often regarded as similar-sounding to the work by alternative rock band, the Pixies, as the guitarist, Joey Santiago is a member of both bands. The record also features drums by Josh Freese, a member of The Vandals and A Perfect Circle. The album took over two years to create.

Track listing

Credits

The Martinis
Linda Mallari – lead vocals, piano, guitar
Joey Santiago – guitars

Additional musicians
Paul De Lisle – bass guitar
Miiko Watanabe – bass guitar
Josh Freese – drums, percussion
Ben Mize – drums, percussion
Dean Martin Hovey – bells, whistles
Lisa Mallari Dussinger – backing vocals

Production
Bradley Cook – producer, mixer
Blag Dahlia – producer, mixer

External links
Cooking Vinyl Website

2004 albums
Cooking Vinyl albums
The Martinis albums